Duke Ping of Cáo was a nobleman in ancient China, who lived during the Zhou Dynasty.

He was ruler of the State of Cao from 527 BC to 524 BC, successor and son of Duke Wu of Cao.

His personal name was 須/须 (Xū).

Pingʻs son Jī Wŭ later became Duke Dao of Cao after Ping died in 524 BC.

References

6th-century BC births
Zhou dynasty people
Chinese dukes
6th-century BC Chinese monarchs
524 BC deaths